Bamu may refer to:

 Mbamu, an island in the Republic of the Congo
 Bamu language, a language of Papua New Guinea
 Bamu Rural LLG, Papua New Guinea
 Bamu River, a river in southwest Papua New Guinea
 Bamu (巴姆), Tibetan-Chinese singer in the Mayu language
 Bamum script, with the ISO 15924 code Bamu, 435

See also
 Bamum (disambiguation)